Joseph Jouthe (born October 17, 1961) is a Haitian politician who served as the 22nd Prime Minister of Haiti from March 4, 2020 until April 
14, 2021.

Biography
Jouthe was born on October 17, 1961 in Thomonde.

In September 2018, he became the Minister of the Environment under the government of Jean-Henry Céant. In September 2019, he became the acting Minister of Economy and Finance.

On March 2, 2020, Jouthe was named Prime Minister of Haiti, beginning his term two days later. He announced on April 14, 2021 that he has resigned as prime minister; Claude Joseph was then appointed by President Jovenel Moise to be his temporary replacement.

References

Living people
1961 births
Prime Ministers of Haiti
Finance ministers of Haiti
Environment ministers
21st-century Haitian politicians
Haitian Tèt Kale Party politicians
People from Centre (department)